Alicia Isabel Adriana Bárcena Ibarra is a Mexican biologist who served as the Executive Secretary of the United Nations Economic Commission for Latin America and the Caribbean (ECLAC) until 31 March 2022.

Education
Bárcena Ibarra holds a bachelor's degree in biology from the National Autonomous University of Mexico (UNAM) and a master's degree in public administration from Harvard University.

Career
Bárcena is a former undersecretary of the environment in the federal cabinet and a former director of Mexico's National Institute of Fisheries (Spanish: Instituto Nacional de Pesca).

Bárcena accrued extensive experience in international organizations. She was Deputy Executive Secretary of the Economic Commission for Latin America and the Caribbean (ECLAC) earlier in her career. In this position, she has actively promoted the implementation of the Millennium Development Goals and on Financing for Sustainable Development in Latin America and the Caribbean. Within ECLAC, she also served as the Chief of the Environment and Human Settlements Division, where she focused on public policies for sustainable development with particular reference to the linkages between environment, economy and social issues.

She has acted as Coordinator of the United Nations Environment Programme (UNEP), in charge of a global programme on environmental citizenship with emphasis on the participation of civil society, as well as adviser to the Latin American and Caribbean Sustainable Development Programme in the United Nations Development Programme (UNDP).

She was the Founding Director of the Earth Council in Costa Rica until 1995. The Earth Council is a non-governmental organization in charge of the follow-up of the agreements reached in the United Nations Conference on Environment and Development (UNCED) held in Rio de Janeiro, Brazil, in 1992.

She collaborated in the UNCED Secretariat as Principal Officer in charge of various topics related to Agenda 21.

On 3 March 2006, United Nations Secretary-General Kofi Annan announced Bárcena's appointment as  Acting Chef de Cabinet in the Executive Office of the Secretary-General.  Her appointment took effect on 8 December 2005 after the departure of the  Deputy Secretary-General, Louise Fréchette, and Mark Malloch Brown’s assumption of his new duties as Deputy Secretary-General.

On 3 January 2007, Secretary-General Ban Ki-moon appointed Bárcena as UN Under-Secretary-General for Management. Her appointment marked the first time since 1992 that this position has not been held by a U.S. citizen.

Within the realm of academia, Bárcena was the Director of the South-East Regional Centre of the Instituto Nacional de Investigaciones sobre Recursos Bióticos in the state of  Yucatán, working closely with the Mayan communities. She has taught and researched on natural sciences mostly on botany, ethnobotany and ecology. She has published a number of articles on sustainable development, namely on financing, public policies, environment and public participation as for example on the online magazine Impakter.

Economic Commission for Latin America and the Caribbean (ECLAC), 2008–2022
In 2008, Ban announced Bárcena's appointment as Executive Secretary of the Economic Commission for Latin America and the Caribbean (ECLAC); she replaced José Luis Machinea. Her term concluded on 31 March 2022. 

From 2014 until 2015, Bárcena served on the Secretary-General's Independent Expert Advisory Group on the Data Revolution for Sustainable Development, co-chaired by Enrico Giovannini and Robin Li. In 2016, she was appointed by Erik Solheim, the Chairman of the Organisation for Economic Co-operation and Development Development Assistance Committee, to serve on the High Level Panel on the Future of the Development Assistance Committee under the leadership of Mary Robinson. From 2016 until 2017, she co-chaired (alongside Janez Potočnik) the International Resource Panel at the United Nations Environment Programme (UNEP).

Other activities
 Global Partnership for Sustainable Development Data, Member of the Board of Directors (since 2017)
 University of Oslo/The Lancet Independent Panel on Global Governance for Health, Member
 World Economic Forum (WEF), Co-Chair of the Global Future Council on the Future of Regional Governance
 World Economic Forum (WEF), Member of the Global Future Council on Geopolitics (2018-2019)
 Inter-American Dialogue, Member of the Board (since 2010)

References

1952 births
Living people
Executive Secretaries of the United Nations Economic Commission for Latin America and the Caribbean
Harvard Kennedy School alumni
Members of the Inter-American Dialogue
Mexican biologists
Mexican officials of the United Nations
Mexican women diplomats
National Autonomous University of Mexico alumni
People from Mexico City
Under-Secretaries-General of the United Nations